Gardner Township is one of seven townships in Johnson County, Kansas, USA.  As of the 2010 census, its population was 2,143.

Unincorporated towns
 New Century

Adjacent Townships
 Lexington Township Northwest
 McCamish West
 Olathe Northeast

Cemeteries
The township contains the Gardner Township Cemetery.

Transportation

Major highways

Airports and landing strips
 New Century Aircenter
 Gardner Municipal Airport

Rivers, Lakes (Ponds), Streams
 Kill Creek
 Lake Gardner

Parks
 Westside Ballpark
 Gardner Celebration Park
 Gardner Airport Park

School districts
 Gardner SD 231
 Desoto USD 232
 Olathe USD 233

External links

Townships in Johnson County, Kansas
Townships in Kansas